Full Grown Men is a 2006 American independent comedy-drama film directed by David Munro and starring Matt McGrath, Judah Friedlander, Alan Cumming, Amy Sedaris, and Deborah Harry, is the bittersweet story of a thirtysomething man with family who grudgingly realizes it is time to trade adolescence for adulthood. The film won the 2007 indieWIRE Undiscovered Gems Film Series Audience Award competition.

Plot
Alby Cutrera is a pathologically nostalgic guy who, at 35 years of age with a wife and young son, really just wishes he could ride his Schwinn 5 speed around all day on a Cherry Slurpee high. His wife Suzanne and son Josh love him because he's funny and creative but Suzanne finally loses patience with Alby and kicks him out of the house.

Alby moves back to Mom's house and looks up his old best friend from childhood, Elias Guber. The two take a trip to Diggityland, a theme park up in central Florida that was their favorite place as kids. Elias is going there to get an award for his work as a special-ed teacher, a decidedly grown-up occupation, while Alby needs a ride up the coast to sell his precious action figures to a collectibles broker – a move he thinks will reinstate him in the good graces of his family and signal his transition into adulthood.

Cast

Festival screenings
Gene Siskel Film Center Chicago  Indie Comedy Sneak Preview! June 22–25, 2007
Provincetown International Film Festival June 15–16, 2007
Florida Film Festival Orlando, Florida March 30–31, 2007
Miami International Film Festival March 9–10, 2007
Mill Valley Film Festival Mill Valley, California West Coast Premiere October 7–15, 2006
CineVegas Film Festival Las Vegas June 9–17, 2006
Tribeca Film Festival New York World Premiere April 27 – May 5, 2006

References

External links
Official website 

 
Allmovie profile
Review at Nerve.com 
New York Magazine review

2006 films
American independent films
2000s road comedy-drama films
American road comedy-drama films
2006 independent films
2000s English-language films
2000s American films